François Patriat (born 21 March 1943) is a French politician of La République En Marche! (LREM) who has been serving as president of the party's group in the Senate since 2017. He has represented the Côte-d'Or department in the Senate since 2008. Patriat also served as Minister of Agriculture and Fisheries in 2002 and President of the Regional Council of Burgundy from 2004 until 2015. He was a member of the Socialist Party before joining La République En Marche! in 2017.

Early life and education
Born in Semur-en-Auxois, Côte-d'Or, Patriat graduated from École nationale vétérinaire d'Alfort (ENVA) in 1968.

Political career

Early beginnings
Patriat joined the Socialist Party (PS) in 1974 and was elected to the General Council of Côte-d'Or for the canton of Pouilly-en-Auxois in 1976, a position he retained until 2008. In 1981, he was elected to the National Assembly. In 1989, Patriat became Mayor of Chailly-sur-Armançon, an office he held until 2001.

Ministership under Prime Minister Jospin
In 2000, Patriat was appointed Secretary of State in charge of small and medium-sized businesses, trade and crafts at the Ministry of the Economy, Finance and Industry under minister Laurent Fabius in the government of Prime Minister Lionel Jospin. In 2002, he was appointed Minister of Agriculture and Fisheries. He left office when Jean-Pierre Raffarin became Prime Minister.

Regional Council of Burgundy
In the 2004 regional elections, Patriat led a list that defeated the list conducted by incumbent Regional Council President Jean-Pierre Soisson. Reelected in 2010, he left the position in 2015, before the region was merged with Franche-Comté.

Ahead of the 2012 French presidential election, Patriat publicly endorsed Dominique Strauss-Kahn as the Socialist Party's candidate.

Member of the Senate, 2014–present
Patriat was elected to the Senate in 2008. Reelected in 2014, he joined La République En Marche! (REM) in 2017. After supporting Emmanuel Macron's successful candidacy for the presidency of the French Republic in the 2017 presidential election and rallying enough of his fellow senators to form a group affiliated with REM in the Senate, he became the new group's president.

Since November 2017, Patriat has been part of LREM's executive board under the leadership of the party's successive chairmen Christophe Castaner and Stanislas Guerini.

References

External links
Page on the Senate website

1943 births
Living people
People from Côte-d'Or
Politicians from Bourgogne-Franche-Comté
Socialist Party (France) politicians
French Senators of the Fifth Republic
Recipients of the Order of the Cross of Terra Mariana, 2nd Class
French Ministers of Agriculture
La République En Marche! politicians
Senators of Côte-d'Or